Timothy Marvin Dunn (born December 18, 1955) is an American businessman. He is the chief executive officer of CrownQuest Operating, an oil and gas business he co-founded in 1996. Dunn is influential in Texas politics, and is a major financial backer of various politically conservative causes and organizations.

Early life and education
Dunn grew up in Big Spring, Texas, where he graduated from Big Spring High School in 1974. He was an Eagle Scout in high school and also played guitar in a rock band. He is the youngest of four boys. Dunn attended Texas Tech University where he earned a degree in chemical engineering in 1978.

Career

Dunn began his career as an engineer at Exxon Production Research Company, where he worked from 1978 to 1980. He went on to work in banking at First City Bancorporation where he stayed until 1987. During his time with First City, he was senior vice president and manager of oil and gas lending. Dunn then served as an executive at Parker & Parsley Petroleum until 1995, where he became chief financial officer. While at Parker & Parsley Petroleum, he oversaw securities transactions and became a supporter of tort reform.

In 1996, Dunn founded his own oil and gas company which became known as CrownQuest Operating. Dunn serves as CrownQuest's chief executive officer. In 2013, Dunn was named as top CEO of a large company by the Texas Independent Producers and Royalty Owners Association and Texas Monthly magazine.

Political involvement
Dunn is influential in state and local politics in Texas and has been called the most effective political donor in Texas. A backer of conservative causes, he has spent millions of dollars encouraging the Texas Republican Party and Texas Legislature to become more conservative. In 2006, he formed the conservative advocacy group Empower Texans and is the group's primary financial contributor. Dunn is a founding board member of Citizens for Self-Governance, which spearheads the Convention of States project, a national effort seeking to call an Article V convention to propose amendments to the U.S. Constitution. He is also a member of the board of directors of the Lucy Burns Institute and vice chairman of the board of directors at the Texas Public Policy Foundation.

Dunn has donated to numerous campaigns, including Shelley Luther's unsuccessful bid in the 2020 Texas State Senate election. He also donated to former Texas Senator Don Huffines' campaign for the 2022 Texas gubernatorial election.

Political views

Criminal justice 
Dunn helped to found the Center for Effective Criminal Justice at the Texas Public Policy Foundation. The Center is part of the Right on Crime movement; it advocates criminal justice reform and emphasizes restorative justice and alternatives to incarceration to reduce the prisoner population. Dunn supported juvenile-justice reform legislation in 2011.

Tax reform 

Dunn opposed a 2006 Texas tax reform proposal to cut property taxes and replace them with new business taxes. He presented a proposal to the Texas Tax Reform Commission showing how school property taxes could be eliminated by using surplus tax revenue and curbing spending.

Educational and religious involvement

Dunn co-founded the Midland Classical Academy, a nonprofit Christian school, where he serves on the board of trustees. The academy uses the Socratic method to teach a curriculum rooted in the development of western civilization. Dunn serves on the board of directors of Grace School of Theology, a Christian seminary with a vision to become "A Seminary to the World," and the First Liberty Institute, a Christian legal defense organization. In June 2014, Dunn joined the board of directors of King's College, a Christian liberal arts college located in New York City. Dunn is also the chairman of the Christian Advisory Board of the Israel Allies Foundation, a non-governmental organization formed in 2007 by Israeli rabbi and politician Binyamin Elon to encourage cooperation among faith-based supporters of Israel in parliaments and legislatures worldwide.

Personal life

Dunn met his wife, Terri, while attending Texas Tech University and they married after his junior year of college. They have six children and 19 grandchildren. Their two-year-old granddaughter, Moriah Wimberly, died in 2015. In 2018, Dunn wrote a book about the experience of losing his granddaughter titled Yellow Balloons: Finding Power To Live Above Your Circumstances. The Dunns reside in Midland, Texas, where they are members of Midland Bible Church. One of Dunn's sons is the Christian singer-songwriter David Dunn.

References

External links
 

People from Big Spring, Texas
Living people
American businesspeople in the oil industry
People from Littlefield, Texas
People from Midland, Texas
Texas Tech University alumni
1955 births